Ripabottoni-S.Elia or Ripabottoni-Sant'Elia Railway station is an Italian train station in Province of Campobasso, Molise, that serves the municipalities of Ripabottoni and Sant'Elia a Pianisi. It is situated in the Ripabottoni territory.

References

Bibliography

This article is based upon a translation of the Italian language version as at May 2017.

Railway stations in Molise
Railway lines opened in 1883